Moshe Mano (born 1955, in Haifa, Israel) is a businessman who is active in the maritime, hospitality, and real estate industries.  He is the founder, President and CEO of the Mano Holdings Group, which includes Mano Maritime, Mano Holidays, Bambook Properties, and Flamingo Universe, Rodex and Mano City.

He holds 50% of Crown Shipping company. 

The companies in the Mano Holdings Group are rated among the 100 largest companies in Israel for Service & Trade category.
Mano is the founder of the first local radio station in Israel.
He has been an honorary consul of the Russian Federation since 1995 and was also an active collaborator during the 1990s Post-Soviet aliyah (1991-2000).

Biography
In 1932, at the height of the Fifth Aliyah (1929-1939), Moshe Mano's father, Mordechai Mano, emigrated with his parents from Thessaloniki, Greece to what is now Israel, along with other Greek workers who contributed to the construction of the Port of Haifa. Abba Hushi, who was head of the Workers’ Council in Haifa at the time, traveled to Thessaloniki in order to persuade Jewish workers to make Aliyah. Among the 100 families that agreed to relocate were members of the Mano family including Mordechai, who was only 12 years old at the time. This relocation allowed the families to escape the Holocaust, during which the Jews in Thessaloniki were persecuted and killed.

Mordechai Mano raised a family in Israel and is now considered as one of the pioneers in the maritime transportation field, having founded Mano Maritime enterprises in 1945.  He died in 1969, when his son Moshe was only 14 years old.
Moshe Mano, the youngest son of Mordechai Mano, was born in Haifa in 1955 and has lived there ever since.  He did his military service in the Israeli Air Force. He is married to Iris Mano, who is responsible for the Mano Group's Tourism division.
His son Moran also works in the family business in the maritime transport field, and another son, Liran, participates in the real estate and entrepreneurship of the Mano Group.

He published an autobiographical book by the name Yamim Soharim (English: Rough seas).

Business activities
When he was in his early thirties, Moshe Mano decided to carry out his father's vision and establish a new maritime company. He established Mano Maritime, and the firm subsequently became a subsidiary of the Mano Holdings Group which Mano owns. Over the years, the group has expanded to include additional activities: cargo ships, passenger ships, real estate, hotels in Israel and abroad, technology, communications, etc. The company has a broad network of international relations and cooperates with global maritime companies such as the Japanese transportation company "K" Line and Ocean Network Express (“ONE”). 

Mano Maritime operates a diversified shipping fleet: container ships, bulk carriers, automobile transport, and other cargo vessels. In 2009, Mano have commenced managing the Golden Iris cruise ship and soon afterwards began operating leading cruises from and to Israel.
In 2018 Mano commenced managing the cruise ship Crown Iris.
In the real estate field, the company buys and leases commercial buildings, and in 2012 it entered the hotel industry by acquiring hotel properties both locally and internationally.

For the past few years, Moshe Mano, the Mano Group and Mano Maritime Ltd. have been listed among the top 100 companies on the Israeli market in the Dun & Bradstreet ratings in the service & trade category.

Moshe Mano is also a business angel and invests in additional fields such as the Israeli hi-tech industry.

Social and community activities
From 1991 through the mid-2000s, during the period of the 1990s Post-Soviet aliyah, Moshe Mano collaborated with the EEF and sent Mano Maritime's passenger ships to bring over 120,000 immigrants to Israel from the former USSR.
In 1995, Mano was awarded the title of honorary consul of Russia in Haifa and the north of Israel.

In 1991 he established Radio 1 (later become Haifa Radio) the first local radio station in Israel, broadcasting to the North and throughout the Haifa region.

The Israeli Navy awarded Moshe Mano the title Notable of the Israeli Navy for his many years of contribution and assistance to both the sailors and the Navy in different domains including a memorial cruise to the INS Dakar submarine for the benefit of families of the crew.
Mano also contributes to various volunteer associations and charitable organizations such as women's shelters, boarding schools, educational institutions for children, and others.
He has also contributed to the community by providing leisure cruises for holocaust survivors, children with cancer or at risk, and others in need.

Awards and recognition
1995: Honorary Consul of the Russian Federation in Haifa and the North of Israel.
2005: Awarded the rank of “Notable” by the Israeli Navy for services rendered.
2009: The Israeli Economy award by Haifa University.
2009: Honorary resident of the city Alanya, Turkey. 
2018: Honorary title of the city Larnaca, Cyprus

References

External links
Mano Holdings Ltd.’s official website
Mano Group on D&S 100 Leading Companies in the Israeli Market

Israeli businesspeople in shipping
Israeli chief executives
Honorary consuls of Russia
Israeli people of Greek-Jewish descent
1955 births
Living people